Rossiya Tournament 1972 was played in Ulyanovsk on 15–18 January 1972. It was the first time the Rossiya Tournament was arranged. The Soviet Union won the tournament.

The tournament was decided by round-robin results like a group stage.

Results

Sources 
 Norges herrlandskamper i bandy 
 Sverige-Sovjet i bandy 
 Rossija Tournament 

1972 in Soviet sport
1972 in bandy
1972